Qian Mountains or Qianshan, a branch of the Changbai Mountains on the China-North Korea border, start from eastern Jilin Province, China, and extend to eastern and southern Liaoning Province, down to Liaodong Peninsula.

Some of the prominent mountains are:
 Dahei Shan (Dalian)
 Huabo Shan (Benxi) - The highest peak
 Laomao Shan (Dalian)
 Laotie Shan (Dalian)
 Qian Shan (Anshan)
 Wunv Shan (Benxi)

See also
 Changbai Mountains
 Jilin Province
 Liaoning Province

Mountain ranges of China
Landforms of Jilin
Landforms of Liaoning